Laços de Sangue (lit. Blood Ties) is a Portuguese-Brazilian telenovela which broadcast on SIC from September 2010 to October 2011. It is a co-production between SIC and Brazilian Rede Globo. Laços de Sangue won the International Emmy Award for Best Telenovela in 2011.

Plot
In 1984, two sisters, Inês and Marta, fall into the strong currents of a river while fighting each other over a doll. Their father manages to save Inês, the oldest of the two, but Marta is nowhere to be found and is presumed dead. Their mother, pregnant of a boy, witnesses everything, and grieves the death of her husband (who died rescuing his daughters), and supposedly, of her youngest daughter.

In the current day, Inês is a strong, kind person, who owns the M restaurant with her mother. She's in love with João, a doctor that constantly volunteers to partake in humanitarian causes. When he returns from one of those campaigns in the Amazon, he realizes how much he truly loves Inês, and proposes to her, to which she says yes. However, their happiness is ruined by multiple tragedies going on in their lives, such as João's grandfather suffering a stroke and, during their wedding announcement dinner, João's sister being fatally shot in the sequence of a robbery.
Meanwhile, Marta, Inês' missing and presumed dead sister, lives her life as Diana, a pretty but power-hungry lady that pities her vulgar life. After the accident with her and Inês, - whose resulting shock made her lose her memory about her past - she was found, adopted by a new family, whom, moments before finding her, had been mourning their own dead child. Diana doesn't know anything about her real family, until she hears a conversation between her adoptive parents that reveals the secret. She then remembers everything, and searches for her biological family, which she eventually finds and swears one thing: revenge. Particularly on Inês, whom she promises that she'll take everything away from her (from her material goods, to her own boyfriend João) and live the life that she believes her sister stole from her.

Cast
Diana Chaves as Inês
Diogo Morgado as João
Joana Santos as Diana/Marta
Dânia Neto as Marisa

Awards and nominations

International Broadcast
The series also broadcast in several Latin American countries, including Argentina, Uruguay, Brazil, Bolivia, Ecuador, Paraguay, Peru, Dominican Republic, Costa Rica, and Nicaragua. In May 2014, Laços de Sangue began broadcasting in Angola on TV Zimbo and in Italy on Rai 1 where it is titled Legami. In Indonesia, the series aired on NET. beginning October 26, 2019 under the title Inês & Diana.

References

External links
Official website 

2010 telenovelas
2010 Portuguese television series debuts
2011 Portuguese television series endings
Portuguese telenovelas
Sociedade Independente de Comunicação telenovelas
Portuguese-language telenovelas
International Emmy Award for Best Telenovela